Maple Plain Library is a public Hennepin County library in Maple Plain, Minnesota.

Location
It is located on 5184 Main Street East. The library has operated out of several locations since it opened its doors in 1922. The current and permanent location opened in 1973. The library offers meeting room spaces and technology and computer services. Their collection holds Spanish materials in their language collection. The Maple Plain Library served wide area including the towns around the border of Hennepin and Wright counties. These towns in the service area include Loretto, Minnetrista, Orono, and Greenfield.

History
Library service in Maple Plain began in 1922 out of an old Post Office building on Main Street. The first librarian in the Maple Plain Library was Amanda Johnson who served from 1923- 1959. After operating in the post office for a few years the library then moved to a lot adjoining Ms. Johnson's home. The village paid Johnson $10/ year for the use of her land. The building on the Johnson lot was remodeled to be heated with a parlor furnace. In 1959 Johnson fell breaking her hip and retired. The librarian replacing Johnson was Pearl Gotham in the same location until 1963.
  
In 1964 the library then moved in 1964 to the old State Bank building on Main St. It then again moved in 1973 to its permanent location.  The building as the Miller store building on Main St. The Miller Store previously had been a local convenience store and after a fire destroyed almost half of it, it was then used as a gas station.

References

Libraries in Minnesota
Hennepin County Library